Ella Sergeyeva is a retired Russian rower who won six European titles in the coxed four between 1958 and 1964.

References

Year of birth missing (living people)
Living people
Russian female rowers
Soviet female rowers
European Rowing Championships medalists